Poor Jenny may refer to:
Poor Jenny (film), a 1912 German silent film
Poor Jenny (song), a 1959 song by The Everly Brothers
An alternate name for the nursery rhyme Poor Mary
An alternate name for the song The Saga of Jenny